The Palacio Arzobispal is the residence of the Archbishop of Manila located in Intramuros, Manila. The Archiepiscopal Palace of Manila was established as one of the five episcopal palaces in the Philippines.

The Arzobispado
The Arzobispado was the residence and office of the Archbishop of Manila, located along Calle Arzobispo. The site was purchased during the episcopacy of Archbishop Millan de Poblete (1653–1667). It had a drapery-decked throne room, wherein formal receptions were held. The building was destroyed in 1944 during the bombing of Manila in the Second World War. Since then, no attempts were made to rebuild the palace. The site is presently occupied by a guesthouse, the archdiocesan chancery, and archives.

At present, there are nine offices under the Arzobispado managed by Moderator Curiae Rev. Msgr. Rolando R. dela Cruz. These are the Archdiocesan Archives of Manila, Archdiocesan Museum of Manila, Auditing Department, Chancery, Human Resource Development Department, Legal Office, Metropolitan Tribunal of Manila, Properties Administration Department and Treasury and Accounting Department.

Present condition

The other episcopal palace such as the Episcopal Palace of Nueva Segovia (now Vigan) remains in use. Portions were converted into an ecclesiastical museum. The Episcopal Palace of Cebu was in an abandoned state. However, efforts were made to convert it into an archdiocesan museum. The remaining three episcopal palaces of Caceres and Jaro were ruined by war.

Marker from the Intramuros Administration

References

External links

Buildings and structures in Intramuros
Palaces in the Philippines
Roman Catholic Church in Metro Manila
Episcopal palaces of the Catholic Church